Brahmpur is a large village and corresponding community development block in Buxar district of Bihar. It is known for its temple of Shiva, its religious practices, and its cattle fair. People visit Brahmapur to perform religious rituals in the temple of Shiva.

As of 2011, the population of Brahmapur was 17,057, in 2,554 households, while the total population of the block was 196,070, in 28,826 households.

Etymology 
Brahmapur means "the place of Brahma" in Sanskrit. According to Hindu Itihas, the town was founded by Brahma, giving rise to the name Brahmapur ("Brahma" stands for Brahma and "pur" means place).

The inhabitants of Brahmapur speak the Bhojpuri dialect. In Bhojpuri, the city is sometimes referred to as Barahmpur.

History 
In Medieval India, an Islamic invader from Afghanistan Ghaznavi came to destroy the temple and loot its wealth. The people of the village warned him that if he performed these violent acts, Shiva’s third eye would burn him to ashes. Ghaznavi told the people that no such god existed and if it existed, the entrance of the temple would change its direction from east to west. (Every temple of Lord Shankar had its door facing east.) He then informed them that if that were to occur, he would leave the temple untouched and would never return. The next morning, when Ghaznavi came to destroy the temple, he was surprised to see the entrance of the temple had changed from east to west. He left the temple as he had promised.

Demographics 
According to the 2011 Indian census, Brahmapur had a population of approximately 13,727: 7,328 males and 6,399 females. The number of households in Brahmapur was 1,927.

Geography 
Brahmapur is situated at 25°35'57"N 84°18'5"E It is surrounded by many small villages such as Raghunathpur, Purwan, Nimej, Balua, Umedpur, Ramgarh, Garahtha, Gayghat. The landscape is very flat with no mountains.

Transportation 
Brahmapur is not accessible directly by train. Instead, visitors must stop at the nearest railway station in Raghunathpur, which is 3 km from Brahmapur. It can be directly reached by roadways connected with the NH 84, which goes through Brahmapur.

Hospitals 
Brahmapur's government-allocated Primary Health Care Center is located at Raghunathpur, but there are also private hospitals in Brahmapur.

Education 
Brahmeshwar Nath High School provides education from grades six to twelfth and one girls college. In addition, there are two government primary schools, three upper middle schools and around three private schools such as P.L public school (C.B.S.E pattern, class:- Nursery to 10) and paramount children academy (nearest brahampur police station and shiv mandir) in Brahmapur. For higher studies, students go to Dumraon, Buxar, Ara or other places.

Tourism 
Brahmapur is a center of religious tourism. Many people from the Arrah (Bhojpur) District, Buxar district, Ballia District and Chhapra District come to worship Lord Shiva or to get married in the temple. The people of Brahmapur organize a cattle fair, where farmers come from Bihar and Uttar Pradesh to purchase cattle for breeding and herding. The Falguni cattle fair is very famous in Bihar and Uttar Pradesh, and takes place in the Hindu month of Falgun. Horses, elephants and camels are also bought and sold at the fair. October to June is the best time for tours to Brahmapur. However, tours to Brahmapur during the festivals celebrated in the district can also be arranged. The main festivals of the region include Car Festival, Dusshera, Taratarini Festival, Thakurani Yatra, Buda and Khambeshwari Yatra

Economy 
The people of Brahmapur depend primarily on agriculture and, to a lesser extent, tourism. Recently, inhabitants have begun to leave Brahmapur in the same manner as the rest of rural Bihar, in an effort to find better work opportunities elsewhere. And there are two cinema hall and one AC cinema hall, five malls, four bike showrooms and maruti show room, five banks available.

Languages 
The most commonly spoken language in Brahmapur is Bhojpuri. People also speak Hindi, Urdu, and English, to some extent.

Villages 
Brahmapur block contains 104 villages, of which 65 are inhabited and 39 are uninhabited.

See also 
Brahampur (Vidhan Sabha constituency)

References

External links 
 

Cities and towns in Buxar district